A  or mini cineplex is a type of independent movie theater in Japan and Bangladesh that is not under the direct influence of any major film companies. Mini theaters are characterized by their relatively smaller size and seating capacity compared to larger, non-independent movie theaters found in Japan, as well as their programming, which includes independent or arthouse films.

History

In Japan

Origins and rise in popularity
Iwanami Hall, which was originally used as a multipurpose hall, became one of the first mini theaters, able to seat 220 people. The project was headed by Etsuko Tanakno, general manager of Iwanami Hall, and film producer Kashiko Kawakita, who sought to screen films deemed inappropriate for wide distribution.

Mini theaters were popularized throughout Japan in the 1980s. During that decade, mini theaters often screened European independent and arthouse films, such as films produced during the French New Wave, as well as films originating from Hungary, Poland and Bulgaria. Mini theaters also screened independent films produced in Japan by relatively unknown Japanese filmmakers. The popularity of mini theaters continued into the 1990s, and some mini-theater operators, such as Theatre Shinjuku and Eurospace, began investing in film production.

In the 21st century

Several mini theaters in the Tokyo metropolitan area were closed during the late 20th and early 21st centuries. Mini theater Cine Vivant ceased operations in 1999, and Cine Saison and Ginza Theatre Cinema closed in 2011 and 2013, respectively. On April 7, 2020, the COVID-19 pandemic prompted the Japanese government to declare a state of emergency for Tokyo and six other prefectures, resulting in the closure of movie theaters nationwide. Consequently, mini theaters have suffered significant drops in revenue.

In response to the negative financial impact of the pandemic on mini theaters, Japanese filmmakers organized movements to help support them. Directors Kōji Fukada and Ryūsuke Hamaguchi launched a crowdfunding campaign to assist mini theaters; the campaign amassed over 100 million yen in donations in three days.

In Bangladesh
In Bangladesh there are two mini theaters. The first mini cineplex of the country was established on September 20, 2019 in Narayanganj named CineScope. This government-sponsored mini cineplex has 35 seats. Another mini cineplex is Roots Cineclub, situated in Sirajganj, opened on 22 October 2021. The Chittagong City Corporation authority announced to establish a mini cineplex in Chittagong on 5 December 2020.

See also

 Movie palace
 Multiplex (movie theater)

References

Cinemas and movie theaters
Cinemas in Japan
Theatres